DJ Project is a Romanian dance music group, initially consisting of producers Gino Manzotti (Handke Giuseppe) and DJ Maxx (Ovidiu Florea) along with singer Elena Baltagan. The group was formed in 2000 in Timișoara, with their first album, Experience, released in 2001.

At the MTV Europe Music Awards 2006, DJ Project were awarded with "Best Romanian Act" prize.

Discography

Albums 
 Experience (2001)
 Spune-mi tot ce vrei (Tell Me Everything You Want) (2002)
 Lumea ta (Your World) (2004)
 Șoapte (Whispers) (2005)
 Povestea mea (My Story) (2006)
 Două Anotimpuri (Two Seasons) (2007)
 Dj Project & Friends - In the club (2009)
Best of (2011)
 Best of 15 ani (Best of: 15 Years) (2015)

Singles 
Te chem (I'm Calling You)  (2002)
Spune-mi tot ce vrei (Tell Me Everything You Want) (2002)
Lumea ta (Your World) (2004)
Printre vise (Among Dreams) (2004)
Privirea ta (Your Gaze) (2005) #1 Romanian Top 100
Șoapte (Whispers) (2005) #2 Romanian Top 100
Încă o noapte (One More Night) (2006) #1 Romanian Top 100
Ești tot ce am (You're All I Have)  (2006)
Before I Sleep  (2007)
Două anotimpuri (Two Seasons) (2007) #2 Romanian Top 100
Lacrimi de înger (Angel Tears) (2007)
Prima noapte (feat Giulia) (The First Night) (2008)
Departe de noi (Far Away from Us) (2008)
Hotel (2009)
Over and Over Again (feat Deepside Deejays) (2009)
Miracle Love  (2009)
Nu (feat Giulia) (No) (2009)
Regrete (feat Giulia) (Regrets) (2010)
Mi-e dor de noi (I Miss Us) (2011) #1 Romanian Top 100
Crazy in Love (feat Giulia) (2012)
Bun rămas (feat Adela) (Goodbye) (2012)
Fără tine (feat Adela) (Without You) (2013)
Suflet vândut (feat Adela) (A Sold Soul) (2014)
Sevraj (feat Ela Rose) (Withdrawal) (2016)
Ochii care nu se văd (feat Xenia Costinar) (Eyes That Can't See Themselves) (2016)
Duminică (feat Elena Gheorghe) (Sunday) (2017)
Omnia (feat Mira) (2017)
Inimă nebună (feat Mira) (Crazy Heart) (2018)
În locul meu (feat Theo Rose) (In My Place) (2019)
4 Camere (feat AMI) (4 Rooms) (2019)
Retrograd (feat Andia) (Retrograde) (2019)
Slăbiciuni (feat Andia) (Weaknesses) (2020)
Parte din tine (feat Roxen) (Part of You) (2021)
Cheia inimii mele (feat Mira) (The Key of My Heart) (2021)
La timpul lor (feat Emaa) (In Their Time) (2022)
Iubirea mea (feat Ana Baniciu) (My Love) (2022)
Ochii tăi (feat Lidia Buble) (Your Eyes) (2022)
Fulgul (feat HolyMollyMusic) (The Snowflake) (2023)

Notes

External links

 DJ Project - official site
 DJ Project - Doua Anotimpuri
 DJ Project on Discogs

Romanian Eurodance groups
Romanian dance musical groups
MTV Europe Music Award winners
Global Records artists